Up to You is the debut studio album released by Japanese pop singer Michi under Sony Music Entertainment. It was released on 30 September 2009 and peaked at number 4 on the Oricon weekly album chart. It includes the song "Something Missing", which is used in the PlayStation 3/Xbox 360 game Bayonetta.

Track listings

Charts

References

2009 albums